Rome 11 o'clock or Roma, ore 11 (1952) is an  Italian film directed by  Giuseppe De Santis and one of the best examples of Neorealist filmmaking. The dramatic plot is based on the real story of an accident that happened on 15 January 1951 on Via Savoia in Rome when a staircase collapsed because of the weight of two hundred women waiting for a job interview. One woman was killed and 76 were injured.

Augusto Genina made the film Tre storie proibite,  based on the same tragic event.

Plot
In the early 1950s, Italy was suffering from serious unemployment and it was especially difficult for women to get jobs. In response to a newspaper ad seeking a secretary for an accountant's office, the two hundred women crowded the small building's staircase, hoping for an interview. They came from diverse backgrounds: fallen nobles, prostitutes seeking to change their lives, wives with unemployed husbands, and affluent daughters with not enough pension to survive.

Waiting on the stairs, the women exchange impressions and discuss their lives of misery and their tricks for making a living. Gianna, played by Eva Vanicek is first in line, the pawn of a strong-willed mother, while Caterina, played by Lea Padovani, is a prostitute hoping for a new life. Angelina, played by Delia Scala is a servant, also hoping to escape her situation. Other characters include a pregnant unwed mother (Elena Varzi), a young woman who wants to be a singer (Irène Galter), and an artist's mistress (Lucia Bosè).

When a poor workman's wife, Luciana Renzoni, played by Carla Del Poggio, tries to move ahead in the line, the resulting scuffle among the women  causes the staircase to collapse.

The injured are taken to a hospital, but to be treated, the hospital is demanding a payment of 2,300 Lire per day. Many of them are unable to pay and are forced to go home.

Cast

 
Lucia Bosé, Simona
Carla Del Poggio, Luciana Renzoni
Maria Grazia Francia, Cornelia Riva
Lea Padovani, Caterina
Delia Scala, Angelina
Elena Varzi, Adriana
Raf Vallone, Carlo
Massimo Girotti, Nando
Paolo Stoppa, father of Clara
Armando Francioli, Romoletto
Paola Borboni, Matilde
Irène Galter, Clara
Eva Vanicek, Gianna
Checco Durante, father of Adriana
Alberto Farnese, Augusto
Bianca Beltrami
Cabiria Guadagnino
Teresa Ellati
Maria Pia Trepaoli
Fulvia Trozzi
Donatella Trombadori
Helène Vallier
Nando Di Claudio
Fausto Guerzoni
Michele Riccardini
Renato Mordenti
Pietro Tordi
Ezio Rossi
Henry Vilbert
Marco Vicario
Mino Argentieri
Anna Maria Zijno (real survivor at via Savoia)
Maria Ammassari (real survivor at via Savoia)
Renata Ciaffi (real survivor at via Savoia)

Awards
Nastro d'Argento Best Music (Mario Nascimbene)

Reception
New York Times film critic, Bosley Crowther called Rome 11:00 a "vivid, raw-boned movie" and "a film of absorbing interest and persistent emotional power." He also praised Carla Del Poggio for her sensitive portrayal of the anguish felt by her character, Luciana Renzoni, after precipitating the tragedy.

Legacy
In 1956, filmmaker Elio Petri published Roma ore 11, a collection of his interviews with people involved in the tragedy. The documentation originally served as a basis for the film. The work was republished in 2004.

References

External links 
 

1952 films
1950s Italian-language films
Italian black-and-white films
Films set in Rome
Italian films based on actual events
Italian neorealist films
Titanus films
Films directed by Giuseppe De Santis
1952 drama films
Films with screenplays by Cesare Zavattini
Films scored by Mario Nascimbene
Italian drama films
1950s Italian films